Boze, also rendered Buji, is an East Kainji language of Nigeria belonging to the Shammo cluster. Boze is spoken in a contiguous area Bicizà, directly to the north of Jos city in Plateau State, Nigeria.

Dialects include Boze, Gorong, and Firu.

Distribution
Boze (ɛBoze), also called Buji, is spoken in many villages to the west and northwest of Jos.

Below are village names organized by dialect, with modern names are given in parentheses.

Boze dialect
Bīntīrí
Bìsɔ̄ (Rùmáná)
Bɛ̄hɔ̄lɛ̄
Gbàndāŋ
Ɔ̀bɛ̀nɛ̀ àkùrá (Màirágá)
Ɔ̀pɛ̄ɛ̀gɔ̄
Ɔ̀tɔ̀ɔ̀tùsū (Rùmfán Gwómnà)
Rībàmbōzē
Rīdāpɔ̄
Tìpɔ́ɔ̀ táázà (ādònkòròŋ)
Tìpɔ́ɔ̀ tādīzì (Kwánà)
Tūūmū (Sə́rə́rí)
Ūgbàrà
Ùkúū

Gorong dialect
Màlēēmpē (Jéjìn Fílí)
Ɔ̄wɔ̀ɔ̀yɔ̄ɔ̄yɔ̀
Rɛ̀shɔ́kɔ̄
Rɛ̀tɛ̄ɛ̄ rūjà (Ùrɛ̀kùn)
Rɛ̀wɔ̄ɔ̄ (Ràfín Gwázá)
Úlìndāŋ

Firu dialect
Tūmbàkīrì (Kìrāŋ̄gō)
Ùkwə̀shì
Zə̀ə̀lə̀kì (Gìndáu)

Mixed
Zùùkū (NNPC Depot)

Others
Ɛ̀fīīrù (Kòòfá)
Īcīzā
Īncā (Táshà)
Ɔ̀bɛ̀nɛ̀ (Sə́rə́rí)

References

East Kainji languages
Languages of Nigeria